The Lamar–Calder House is a historic house, on the former Lamar Plantation in Richmond, Texas.

History
The land originally belonged to Jane Herbert Wilkinson Long, until it was passed on to Mirabeau B. Lamar, who built the Lamar Plantation. Lamar lived in another house which was later destroyed.

A new house was built in 1859–1861. It was designed in the Greek Revival architectural style. Lamar never lived in the house, as it was completed after his death, but his widow Henrietta Maffitt did. Their daughter Loretto Evalina and her husband, S. D. Calder, the son of public official Robert J. Calder, lived in the house with their four children until they sold it in 1900. The house was owned by the Hendee family from 1908 to 1996. It later belonged to Felix Tijerina's son.

The house has been listed on the National Register of Historic Places since March 30, 2005.

See also

National Register of Historic Places listings in Fort Bend County, Texas

References

External links

Houses on the National Register of Historic Places in Texas
Greek Revival houses in Texas
Houses completed in 1861
Houses in Fort Bend County, Texas
Plantations in Texas